Denzell Arturo García Bojórquez (born 15 August 2003) is a Mexican professional footballer who plays as a defensive midfielder for Liga MX club Juárez.

Career statistics

Club

References

External links
 
 
 

Living people
2003 births
Mexican footballers
Association football midfielders
Club Necaxa footballers
Liga MX players
Footballers from Sinaloa
People from Ahome Municipality